David James Liddiard  (born ) is an Australian former professional rugby league footballer who played in the 1980s and 1990s.

Playing career
Liddiard made his first grade debut for Parramatta in the 1983 season where he won the Dally M rookie of the year award and was also a member of Parramatta's 1983 premiership winning team defeating Manly-Warringah in the grand final.  

The following season, Liddiard played in the 1984 grand final where Parramatta were defeated by Canterbury 6–4.  In 1986, Liddiard joined Penrith and played there for two seasons before rejoining Parramatta.  

Liddiard only managed eight appearances for Parramatta over two years and he left the club to join Manly.  Liddiard spent three years at Manly before retiring at the end of the 1992 season.  

Liddiard played in England for Oldham (1985–86), Hull F.C. (1989–90) and Hull Kingston Rovers (1992–93 and 1993–94).

Post-playing
In 2014 Liddiard was awarded with the Medal of the Order of Australia for his services to Indigenous youth, sporting and employment programs.

References

1961 births
Living people
Australian rugby league players
Hull F.C. players
Hull Kingston Rovers players
Manly Warringah Sea Eagles players
Oldham R.L.F.C. players
Parramatta Eels players
Penrith Panthers players
Rugby league centres
Rugby league fullbacks
Rugby league wingers
Rugby articles needing expert attention
Rugby league players from Penrith, New South Wales
Recipients of the Medal of the Order of Australia